The 2008 Baden Masters was the fourth time the Baden Masters curling event was held. It was held from September 5 - 7, 2008 and was the first event of the 2008-09 World Curling Tour season.

Competing Teams

 Tormod Andreassen 
 Andrey Drozdov
 Niklas Edin  
 Stefano Ferronato
 Pascal Hess 
 Michael Höchner
 Stephan Karnusian 
 Anders Kraupp  
 David Murdoch
 Andreas Schwaller 
 Jiří Snítil 
 Sebastian Stock  
 Thomas Ulsrud
 Bernhard Werthemann 
 Yusuke Morozumi

Playoffs

External links
https://web.archive.org/web/20081229142129/http://baden-masters.ccbadenregio.ch/
Curling Scoops Coverage of the 2008 Baden Masters

Baden Masters, 2008
2008 in Swiss sport
Baden Masters
Curling competitions in Switzerland